Tanjō may refer to:

 Mount Tanjō, a mountain in Hyōgo, Japan
 Tanjō Mountains, a mountain range in Japan, including Mount Tanjō
 Tanjō-ji, a Buddhist temple in Chiba, Japan
 Renge-in Tanjō-ji, a Buddhist temple in Kumamoto, Japan
 alternative name for tanbō, a short staff weapon